Krissy is a given name. Notable people with the name include:

Krissy Badé (born 1980), French basketball player
Krissy Chin (born 1980), professional figure competitor from the United States
Krissy & Ericka, Philippine pop-acoustic music duo
Krissy Kneen, Brisbane-based bookseller and writer
Krissy (Kris Aquino) (born 1971), Filipino talk show host, actress, etc.
Krissy Krissy (born 1988), pop singer based in Brooklyn, New York
Lady Kash and Krissy, Singaporean Indian rapper-singer duo, formed Sept 2008
Krissy Matthews (born 1992), British-Norwegian blues rock singer-songwriter and guitarist
Krissy Moehl (born 1977), American ultramarathon athlete, specializes in trail running
Krissy Nordhoff (born 1974), American musician, plays a pop style of Christian worship music
Krissy Taylor (1978–1995), American model
Krissy Vaine (born 1981), American model, retired professional wrestler and valet
Krissy Wendell-Pohl (born 1981), American women's ice hockey player

See also
Kris
Kriss (disambiguation)
Krisspy